Acraea encoda is a butterfly in the family Nymphalidae. It is found in Gabon and the Democratic Republic of the Congo.

Biology
The larvae feed on Commelina species.

Taxonomy
It is a member of the Acraea encedon species group-   but see also Pierre & Bernaud, 2014

References

Butterflies described in 1981
encoda